Live at the Greek Theatre may refer to:

Live At the Greek Theater, is a live DVD of the musical group British Il Divo, 2006
Chicago & Earth, Wind & Fire – Live at the Greek Theatre, 2005
Live at the Greek, an album by Jimmy Page and The Black Crowes, 2000
Live at the Greek Theatre, an album by Flogging Molly, 2010
Live at the Greek Theatre 2008, DVD by Ringo Starr, 2010
 Live at the Greek Theatre, an album by Joe Bonamassa, 2016

See also
Love at the Greek, a 1977 album by Neil Diamond